Luis Ortiz a.k.a. "Perico" (born December 26, 1949) is a  trumpet player, composer, musical arranger and producer.

Early years
Ortiz was born in San Juan, Puerto Rico, the capital city of the island. He was raised in Santurce, a sector of San Juan. His family's love of music had influenced him before he was old enough to attend school. When his parents realized that their child was interested in music, they enrolled him in the la Escuela Libre de Música Puerto Rico, a school that specializes in music. From there he went on to study at the Conservatory of Music of Puerto Rico.

Puerto Rican Symphony Orchestra
After he graduated from the Conservatory, Ortiz enrolled and attended the University of Puerto Rico to continue his musical education and where he would eventually earn his bachelor's degree.  In 1967, at the age of eighteen, Ortiz participated as a guest sololist with the Puerto Rican Symphony Orchestra conducted by Pablo Casals.

In 1970, Ortiz moved to New York City and gained recognition as a talented trumpet player, composer, arranger and producer for his work with the likes of Tito Puente, Mongo Santamaría, Fania All Stars, Blondie and David Bowie.  He also accompanied Ann-Margret, Dionne Warwick, Diahann Carroll, Trini Lopez, Engelbert Humperdinck, Sammy Davis, Jr., Tony Bennett, Paul Anka and The Supremes with his trumpet.

Ortiz's own band
In 1971, Ortiz formed his own band and won the "Diplo" award in Puerto Rico for "The Best Trumpet Player of the Year".  He was also awarded four Latin New York Magazine Trophies, "Best Trumpet Player of the Year", "Arranger of the Year", "Best Orchestra of the Year" and "Musician of the Year".  In 1981, he was awarded an "ACE" Award for "Best Interpreter of Salsa Music"  and another "ACE" award in 1982 for the "Best New York Orchestra".  In 1987, Ortiz and his band set out on a world tour which included the following places: United States, Puerto Rico, South America, Central America and Europe.

Discography
The following are among Ortiz's Discography list:
 Super Salsa (1978)
 My Own Image (1978)
 One of a Kind (1979)
 El Astro (1981)
 Sabroso! (1982)
 Sabor Tropical (1983)
 Entre Amigos (1983)
 El Isleño (1984)
 La Vida en Broma (1985)
 In Tradition (1986)
 Breaking the Rules (1987)
 Vuelvo Otra Vez (1990)
 At Valley Cottage (1990)
 The Man, His Trumpet and His Music... Are Back! (1992)
 Café con Leche y Dos de Azúcar (1996)
 Emociones (1998)
 Jamming (2002)
 Déjalo Entrar (2004)
 Cristo Está en Victoria (2007)
 Tiempo de Amar (2013)
 Sigo Entre Amigos (2021)

Compilations 

 Lo Mejor de Luis "Perico" Ortiz (1981)
 Millonarios de la Salsa (2002)

Luis "Perico" Ortiz Productions, Inc.
In 1988, Ortiz founded his first company, Dialen Promotions, Inc.  The company offers advertising, sound engineering, production and arrangement services in its own studios for radio and television "jingles".  Among his clients are Smirnoff, McDonald's, Kodak, John Casablancas, Polaroid and HBO.

In 1993, Ortiz founded in Puerto Rico another company, Luis "Perico" Ortiz Productions, Inc.  His new clients include Walt Disney Company and Quincy Jones.  During the decade of the 1990s, Ortiz traveled with his band and performed in Aruba, Colombia and Japan.  He also performed in Puerto Rico, alongside Lucecita Benítez and Tommy Olivencia, at the Luis A. Ferré Center of the Performing Arts in San Juan.  Ortiz directed and produced a recording for Japanese singer Yoshihito Fukumoto member of the band Sweet Basil, Inc.

Later years
In 2002, Ortiz won a "TU Musica" Award for the "Best Christmas Production" and in 2004 he produced the first ever salsa gospel album.  Luis "Perico" Ortiz currently continues to produce music and sound tracks.  He is also a professor at the Music Conservatory of Puerto Rico where he teaches Jazz Performance and  Caribbean Music.

See also

List of Puerto Ricans

External links
 Luis "Perico" Ortiz

References

1949 births
Living people
Puerto Rican trumpeters
Puerto Rican composers
Puerto Rican male composers
People from San Juan, Puerto Rico
Fania Records artists
21st-century trumpeters
21st-century American male musicians